Professional Photographers of America (PPA) is a nonprofit trade association of professional photographers. As of August 2022, PPA has 34,000 members.

History

19th century

The association began in December 1868 as the National Photographic Association of the United States (NPA).  The group's first goal was to unite against Ambrotype patent restrictions. Although succeeding in preventing the reissue of the patent, the executive committee of the NPA became discouraged, and, the group disbanded in 1876 because of lack of interest.

The Professional Photographers of America, as it is known today, was officially founded in April 1880 as the Photographers Association of America, Inc., by members of the Chicago Photographic Association and the former National Photographic Association. In their first meeting in April PAA elected John Ryder from Cleveland, Ohio, as its first president. From August 23 to 26, 1880, 237 photographers attended PAA's first convention in Chicago. At the 1880 convention, a committee demonstrated the new gelatin dry plate imaging process. American daguerreotype pioneers also attended the early PAA conventions, including John H. Fitzgibbon. The daguerreotype, introduced in 1839–1840, was the first practical and profitable photographic process.

20th century
In 1909, the membership installed its first governing body, the Congress of Photography. The Congress was composed of delegates from around the country who transacted official association business. Previously, all association business had been conducted by those who happened to attend conventions, resulting in problems of organizational continuity. The Congress continued until 1929 when the National Council became the official governing body, representing 37 associations and clubs nationwide.

By 1913, the photography association had grown to 725 members, expanding to 2,272 members in 1916. When World War I began, many PAA members contributed to the United States effort by joining the photography section of the Signal Corps. After the war, all photographers of the section were made honorary PAA members through the Liberty War Section of the association.

In 1921, The Daguerre Club of Indiana donated to PAA a building in Winona Lake, Indiana, for the purpose of establishing a photography school. Thus, was born the professional school which was to become the Winona International School of Professional Photography. Winona operated classes for professional photographers each summer until 1984 when the school relocated to its Mount Prospect, Illinois campus, where it operated until 1994 when it was relocated to Atlanta, Georgia.

Just as PAA celebrated its 50th anniversary in 1930, the Depression hit. Despite efforts to boost membership and provide new programs, the Depression took its toll. During these years (1931–34), the association suffered along with the country. Budgets were cut, memberships were canceled, and no conventions were held. By 1934, association leaders were spearheading a drive to build membership and combat rampant price-cutting under the National Recovery Act, which was signed into law that year. They developed the Code of Fair Competition for the Photographic and Photofinishing Industry, which would require every person or firm selling photographic products or services to comply with certain requirements as to wages, hours, prices, and trade practices. The tool now existed to revitalize the association and improve the profession so that it could do its part in returning the country to prosperity. These hopes were soon dashed when the National Recovery Act was declared unconstitutional, affecting all such codes under its jurisdiction. The association suffered a further setback when World War II erupted. In spite of this difficult period, PAA continued to offer new benefits to its members, including the Directory of Professional Photography, which made its first appearance in 1938, and the degree program, which awarded its first Master of Photography degree in 1939.

The organization changed its name to Professional Photographers of America, Inc., in 1958, to distinguish the association from emerging amateur photography organizations. That same year, PPA joined the Mississippi-Alabama Associated Photographers (later renamed the Professional Photographers of Mississippi-Alabama) and the University of Mississippi to hold the first conference on professional photography with joint participation from a local association, national association, and major university.

In 1993, the Association moved its headquarters from Chicago to Atlanta.

21st century
In 2001, PPA began taking a more active role in protecting photographers' rights with the creation of the Copyright and Government Affairs Department. PPA is lobbying on behalf of photographers on Capitol Hill.

In 2015, PPA acquired PhotoVision, an online educational platform that allows it to offer its member photographers educational videos.

Magazine
PPA has published Professional Photographer magazine since 1907.

Advocacy
In August 2019, the National Press Photographers Association and the American Society of Media Photographers filed an amicus brief in support of Jim Olive in University of Houston System vs. Jim Olive Photography, D/B/A Photolive, Inc. The brief was joined by the North American Nature Photography Association, Graphic Artists Guild, American Photographic Artists, and Professional Photographers of America. "The case began when Texas photographer Jim Olive discovered that the University of Houston was using one of his aerial photographs for marketing purposes without permission. When Olive asked the University to pay for the use, they refused and told him they were shielded from suit because of sovereign immunity, which protects state government entities from many lawsuits." After a negative ruling from a Texas appellate court Olive hopes to continue his fight.

In 2019, the Supreme Court of the United States granted certiorari in Allen v. Cooper, raising the question of whether Congress validly abrogated state sovereign immunity via the Copyright Remedy Clarification Act in providing remedies for authors of original expression whose federal copyrights are infringed by states. Thirteen amici including; the United States Chamber of Commerce, the Recording Industry Association of America, the Copyright Alliance, the Software and Information Industry Association, Professional Photographers of America and the National Press Photographers Association, filed briefs in support of Allen. Those briefs proposed various doctrines under which the CRCA could validly abrogate sovereign immunity and variously re-asserted and supported the reasons why Congress examined and enacted CRCA, claiming that Congress was fair in finding that states had abused immunity and that an alternative remedy was needed.  On November 5, 2019, the United States Supreme Court heard oral arguments in Allen v. Cooper. A decision in the case is expected in the late spring of 2020.

See also
 International Association of Panoramic Photographers (IAPP)

References

External links

 PPA website

American photography organizations
Photography organizations established in the 19th century
Professional associations based in the United States